Vaughn is a town in Guadalupe County, New Mexico, United States. The population was 446 at the 2010 census, down from the figure of 539 recorded in 2000. It is located at an intersection of the Burlington Northern Santa Fe and Union Pacific railroad lines.

History
Vaughn is named after Major George W. Vaughn, a civil engineer who was employed by the Santa Fe railroad. Vaughn was established in the early 20th century as a Southern Pacific Railroad town. The town's importance grew when a second railroad, the Eastern Railway of New Mexico (an Atchison, Topeka and Santa Fe line from Belen to Clovis), was completed in 1907 with Vaughn as a division point. A large two-story depot, a roundhouse, and a Harvey House hotel were constructed shortly thereafter. Vaughn was incorporated in 1919 and in 1920 had a population of 888, according to the U.S. census.

The town was one of the shooting scenes for Bobbie Jo and the Outlaw starring Wonder Woman actress Lynda Carter.

The Guadalupe County Sheriff's Department, New Mexico Rangers, the New Mexico State Police and Motor Transportation Police and the Vaughn Police Department (presently a one-man agency) all patrol the town, which, according to the United States Homeland Security, is a known drug-smuggling route.

Geography
Vaughn is located in southwestern Guadalupe County at  (34.601253, -105.206410). U.S. Routes 54, 60, and 285 pass through the town as 8th Street. US 54 leads northeast  to Santa Rosa, the Guadalupe County seat, and southwest  to Alamogordo. US 60 leads east  to Clovis and west  to Interstate 25 in the Rio Grande valley. US 285 leads southeast  to Roswell; to the west it follows US 60  to Encino, then turns northwest and leads an additional   to Interstate 40 at Clines Corners.

Demographics

As of the census of 2000, there were 539 people, 232 households, and 154 families residing in the town. The population density was 96.3 people per square mile (37.2/km). There were 338 housing units at an average density of 60.4 per square mile (23.3/km). The racial makeup of the town was 52.69% White, 0.37% Native American, 43.97% from other races, and 2.97% from two or more races. Hispanic or Latino of any race were 87.01% of the population.

There were 232 households, out of which 29.3% had children under the age of 18 living with them, 48.7% were married couples living together, 12.9% had a female householder with no husband present, and 33.2% were non-families. 31.0% of all households were made up of individuals, and 13.8% had someone living alone who was 65 years of age or older. The average household size was 2.32 and the average family size was 2.88.

In the town, the population was spread out, with 25.4% under the age of 18, 7.8% from 18 to 24, 24.7% from 25 to 44, 25.4% from 45 to 64, and 16.7% who were 65 years of age or older. The median age was 39 years. For every 100 females, there were 83.3 males. For every 100 females age 18 and over, there were 82.7 males.

The median income for a household in the town was $23,083, and the median income for a family was $27,059. Males had a median income of $25,833 versus $14,444 for females. The per capita income for the town was $11,014. About 13.9% of families and 21.7% of the population were below the poverty line, including 20.1% of those under age 18 and 17.7% of those age 65 or over.

Education
Vaughn Municipal Schools is the local school district.

Gallery

See also

 List of municipalities in New Mexico

References

External links

Towns in New Mexico
Towns in Guadalupe County, New Mexico